Sangareya Bay is a bay in the coast of Guinea on the Atlantic Ocean.

Geographyit
The Sangareya Bay opens to the west and is located just to the north of Conakry. The Los Islands (Îles de Los) are located about 2 km off the headland limiting the bay on its southern side  .

See also
Îles de Los  ............

References

Bays of the Atlantic Ocean
Bodies of water of Guinea
Bays of Africa